The Manti Motor Company Building, also known as the Utah-Idaho Motor Company Building and Nell's Motor in Manti, Utah, was built in 1916.  It was listed on the National Register of Historic Places in 2008. The building was designed by Lauritz Peder Miller.

References

National Register of Historic Places in Sanpete County, Utah

Buildings and structures completed in 1916
1916 establishments in Utah